The Throne Room  was a chamber built for ceremonial purposes during the 15th century BC inside the palatial complex of Knossos, Crete, in Greece. It is found at the heart of the Bronze Age palace of Knossos, one of the main centers of the Minoan civilization and is considered the oldest throne room in Europe.

Environment
The throne room was unearthed in 1900 by British archaeologist Arthur Evans, during the first phase of his excavations in Knossos. It was found in the center of the palatial complex and west of the central court. This throne room is considered the oldest stone throne of the Aegean region, indeed the oldest in Europe. The chamber contains an alabaster seat on the north wall, identified by Evans as a "throne", while two Griffins rest on each side are staring at it. Moreover, on three sides it contains gypsum benches. It was part of a larger suite that also included an anteroom and an inner chamber with a ledge that was possibly a chapel. The throne room was accessed from the anteroom through two double doors. According to Evans's estimates, a total of thirty people could be accommodated both in the throne room and its anteroom. The room received its final form in Late Minoan IIIA period, since it was a latter addition to the palace that occurred during the last phase of occupation after 1450 BC.

Purpose

Initially, Evans believed that this area was designed to serve a religious purpose, while he claimed that this was the priest-king's seat and that the presence of the griffins confirmed that this king was somehow beyond mortal realms. He also identified the stone throne as the seat of the mythical king of Crete, Minos, evidently applied Greek mythology. On the other hand, archaeologists Helga Reusch and Friedriech Matz suggested that the throne room was a sanctuary of a female divinity and that a priestess who sat there was her impersonator. The stone benches around the walls suggest a sitting council or perhaps a court, while a sunken area, called by Evans a "lustral basin", partially partitioned off at one side, was used for ritual bathing. In view of the civil and religious powers held by the king, there can be little argument against the notion that proceedings of an official character began with sacred ceremonials.

According to various views, the throne itself may have actually had more religious than political significance, functioning in the re-enactment of epiphany rituals involving a High Priestess, as suggested by the iconography of griffins, palms, and altars in the wall-paintings. More recently, it has been suggested that the room was only used at dawn at certain times of the year for specific ceremonies.

Mycenaean influence
Various archaeologists claim that the room and its furniture most likely date to the time of the Mycenaean takeover circa after 1450 BC when political conditions in Crete were entirely different, as indicated by the concurrent appearance of elite tombs, individual burials and the presence of the Mycenaean Greek Linear B script. At that time, the palace at Knossos seems to have been modified in a minor way in order to include features such as the throne room. Especially, the stylized paintings of heraldically opposed griffins were popular in later era Mycenaean wall painting but not seen before in Crete. For instance, similar wall decoration was also found in the throne room of the Mycenaean palace of Pylos in the Peloponnese.

See also
 List of Aegean frescos

References

Sources

External links 

Buildings and structures completed in the 15th century BC
1900 archaeological discoveries
Minoan sites in Crete
Mycenaean Crete
Minoan frescos
Knossos
Individual rooms